Firecrackers is a 2018 Canadian drama film written and directed by Jasmin Mozaffari. An expansion of Mozaffari's 2013 short film of the same name, the film stars Michaela Kurimsky and Karena Evans as two teenage girls trying to escape their small town.

The film has its world premiere on September 8, 2018 at the 2018 Toronto International Film Festival. It was released theatrically on March 29, 2019 in Canada and on July 12, 2019 in the United States.

Plot 
Lou and Chantal are best friends whose plan to leave their isolated small town to move to the city are threatened when Chantal is assaulted by her possessive ex-boyfriend. The young women take revenge and the consequences threaten their chances of ever leaving. The more Lou fights to save her friendship and hold onto her dreams, the more she spins out of control.

Cast

Release

Critical reception 
On Metacritic, the film has a weighted average score of 80 out of 100, based on 11 critics, indicating "generally favorable reviews".

Katie Walsh wrote in the Los Angeles Times, "Firecrackers isn’t just a confident feature debut from Mozaffari, but a daring one, the kind of fast and furious feminine filmmaking that heralds the arrival of several exciting new talents."

The film was named a New York Times Critic's Pick in 2019 and David Edelstein named it to New York (magazine)'s "The Movies We Loved in 2019" list.

Accolades 
In December 2018, the Toronto International Film Festival named the film to its annual year-end Canada's Top Ten films.

References

External links
 
 
 
 

2018 films
2018 drama films
Canadian drama films
English-language Canadian films
2010s English-language films
2010s Canadian films